Bow kites are leading edge inflatable kites that incorporate a bridle on the leading edge.  They are used for the sport of kiteboarding. They can be identified by a flat, swept-back profile and concave trailing edge allowing the kite greater depower. Bow kite design was pioneered by Bruno Legaignoux, and have been licensed to many kite manufacturers. The first major manufacturer to introduce these bow kites to the United States was Cabrinha Kites. 

Bow kites have a wider wind range than C-kites (traditional LEI kites), so two kite sizes (such 7m² and 12m²) could form an effective quiver for winds ranging from 10 to 30+ knots for a 75 kg rider.  This makes bow kites more suitable for beginners to kite sports; however, they are also used by professionals.

Bow kites are used in a variety of kite related sports, including kitesurfing and snowkiting. Because of their depower range, they allow users to combat problems caused by gusts, making them safer to use.  They are also used by kite surfers for wave riding, as their unique shape lends itself to this discipline.

Early kites
While early bow kites allowed kite to be fully depowerable, they had a number of disadvantages compared to classic C-kites.  These included:
 They can get inverted and not fly properly
 They are a bit twitchy and not as stable
 They have heavier bar pressure, which makes them more tiring to fly
 They are more difficult to relaunch (except if they are on the leading edge).
 They lack a "sled boosting" effect when jumping (The jumps are higher and longer, but the technique for jumping is different).

Later bow kites
In 2006, second generation flat LEI kites were developed which combine 100% depower and easy, safe relaunch with higher performance, less performance penalties and reduced bar pressure. The bridle and control bar design has later been refined to give a more direct feel and less bar pressure while small modifications to the kites themselves has provided more stable kites less likely to invert.
Ongoing developments are bringing improvements to this style of kite every year and they are now extremely popular with riders of all abilities.

Safety
Although bow kites make kite flying safer, it is always advisable to seek professional training, as accidents can still occur.

References

Kites
Kitesurfing